Hideyuki Okano (born 26 January 1959 in Tokyo, Japan) is a Japanese physiology professor and the current dean of Keio University School of Medicine. He is also the team leader of the Laboratory for Marmoset Neural Architecture, at RIKEN Brain Science Institute. His lab is the first in the world to produce transgenic marmosets (Callithrix jacchus) with germline transmission. He is a director of the International Society for Stem Cell Research.

Academic life
Okano graduated from Keio University School of Medicine in 1983. He worked for Johns Hopkins University School of Medicine between 1989 and 1993. He was a professor at University of Tsukuba and Osaka University before returning to his home university in 2001. Since 2001, he is a professor at Keio University.

Selected honors and awards
 Erwin von Bälz Award (from Boehringer Ingelheim) in 2014
 A Medal of Honor with Purple Ribbon in 2009
 Distinguished Scientist Award (from University of Catania, School of Pharmacy) in 2004

References

External links
 Okano Lab
 Prof. Okano talking about Brain Mapping and Psychiatric disorders modeling at the Brain Forum 2016 in Lausanne

Living people
1959 births
People from Tokyo
Academic staff of Keio University
Keio University alumni
Recipients of the Medal of Honor (Japan)
Japanese physiologists